William II (29 April 1469 – 11 July 1509) was Landgrave of Lower Hesse from 1493 and Landgrave of Upper Hesse after the death of his cousin, William III, Landgrave of Upper Hesse in 1500.

William II is also called "William the Middle" to distinguish him from his elder brother "William I the Elder", and his cousin "William III, the Younger".  His parents were Louis II the Frank (1438–1471) and Mechthild, daughter of Count Louis II of Württemberg.

William II became Landgrave of Lower Hesse in 1493, after his brother William I resigned.

On 9 November 1497 William II married Yolande, daughter of Frederick II of Vaudémont. She died on 21 May 1500 after the marriage produced one child, William (27 March 1500 – 8 April 1500). The same year on 20 October, his second marriage was to Anna of Mecklenburg-Schwerin (14 September 1485 – 12 May 1525), who bore him three children:

 Elisabeth (4 March 1502 – 6 December 1557)
 Magdalena (18 July 1503 – September 1504)
Philip I, (13 November 1504 – 31 March 1567)

In 1500, William II reunited the Landgraviate of Hesse after the death of his cousin William III.  In 1503, Emperor Maximilian I commissioned William with executing the ban on Elector Philip of the Palatinate.

Ancestors

External links
Wikisource: Allgemeine Deutsche Biographie, "Wilhelm II. (Landgraf von Hessen)"
Genealogy of William II

|-

1469 births
1509 deaths
Landgraves of Hesse
House of Hesse
Burials at St. Elizabeth's Church, Marburg